Northlands Park was the "Alberta A circuit" horse racing track at Northlands in Edmonton, Alberta. The horse racing season generally consisted of a spring harness (Standardbred) meet from February/March, a Thoroughbred meet from May/June to September/October and a fall harness meet to mid-December. Northlands Park (formerly Northlands Spectrum) was the building name for the grandstand.

There were three dining areas on the second floor. Colours was the main dining room overlooking the race track and had a seating capacity of 700. Uplinks Theatre was the simulcast restaurant area and featured 6 projection televisions and up to 26 different simulcast race broadcasts from North American tracks and Sha Tin in Hong Kong. Playbook Lounge was open limited hours and was available for private functions, sports broadcast events (27 televisions) and private parties. There were two other concessions on the second floor - Rock's and The Deli - that were open during live horse racing.

The track opened in 1900 to replace Rossdale Flats with upgrades in 1995 and 2005.

The Slots at Northlands Park were the main-floor slot machine gaming room and featured Las Vegas-style slot machines and VLTs and had two dining areas - the Slot Lounge and the Slot Grill.  

The Paddock Theatre hosted the post position draw for the Canadian Derby, Northlands Park's largest and most prestigious annual thoroughbred race. Directly outside of the Paddock Theatre was the outdoor paddock area - featuring a barbecue concession window with beer service, paddock viewing terrace and the race commentary television broadcast room.

Northlands Park was also the corporate operating name for Edmonton Northlands. The name was adopted from the race track name in 1995 and changed to Northlands in 2006. 

Northlands Park closed on January 31, 2019. Its successor, the Century Mile Racetrack and Casino, opened on April 1, 2019.

See also
 List of casinos in Canada

References

External links
Northlands Park website

1900 establishments in the Northwest Territories
Sports venues completed in 1900
Defunct horse racing venues in Canada